The men's 1500 metres competition at the 2018 Asian Games took place from 29 August 2018 until 30 August 2018 at the Gelora Bung Karno Stadium.

Schedule
All times are Western Indonesia Time (UTC+07:00)

Records

Results
Legend
DNF — Did not finish

Round 1
 Qualification: First 4 in each heat (Q) and the next 4 fastest (q) advance to the final.

Heat 1

Heat 2

Final

References

Men's 1500 metres
2018